European Parliament elections were held in Denmark on 15 June 1989 to elect the 16 Danish members of the European Parliament.

Results
Seats are allocated first by the D'Hondt method to electoral coalitions (Social Democrats and Danish Social Liberal Party, Venstre and Conservative People's Party, People's Movement against the EEC and Socialist People's Party, Centre Democrats and Christian People's Party) and the remaining parties by themselves; then subsequently between the parties in each coalition.

References

Denmark
European Parliament elections in Denmark
Europe